Conrad of Eberbach (died 18 September 1221) was a Cistercian monk, and later abbot, of Eberbach Abbey, Germany, and historian of the early Cistercian Order.

Life 
Nothing is known of Conrad's early life. From no later than 1169 he was a Cistercian monk at Clairvaux. At some unknown date (perhaps 1206) he moved to Eberbach Abbey in the Rheingau, of which from 1 May 1221 he was abbot, and where he died in the same year.

Exordium 
Conrad's single great work, the Exordium Magnum Cisterciense or Exordium magnum Ordinis Cisterciensis, in six books, concerns the early history of the Cistercians. Books 1-4 were written while he was still at Clairvaux, in the time of Abbot Garnier de Rochefort (1186-93); the last two were added at Eberbach, between 1206 and 1221. It is a book of instruction, on the theme of the early days and flowering of the Cistercians at Clairvaux, containing much information on significant persons (among them Saint Bernard of Clairvaux and other great Cistercian figures) and events in the life of the abbey and order.

The Exordium was widely disseminated as a work of Christian spirituality by the Cistercians and also in the 15th century by the Dutch devotio moderna.

Quotation 
To get acquainted with the Cistercian environment and its spirit, it is essential to become familiar with the Exordium magnum Ordinis Cisterciensis, a document of the highest value. (Étienne Gilson)

Notes and references

Sources 
 
 
 
 Worstbrock, Franz Josef, 1985: Konrad von Eberbach in Verfasserlexikon, Bd. 5. 2nd  edition, col. 156–159

Translations 
 Benedicta Ward (translator and editor), Paul Savage (translator), E. Rozanne Elder (editor), 2012: The Great Beginning of Citeaux: The Exordium Magnum of Conrad of Eberbach: A Narrative of the Beginning of the Cistercian Order (Cistercian Fathers series No 72). Translation of the critical edition by Bruno Griesser, Series Scriptorum Sacri Ordinis Cisterciensis, vol 2: Rome 1961.
 Heinz Piesik: Exordium Magnum Cisterciense oder Bericht vom Anfang des Zisterzienserordens von Conradus Eberbacensis, 2 volumes (Books 1-3 and 4-6), Quellen und Studien zur Zisterzienserliteratur. Publications of the Zisterzienserakademie volumes 3 and 5, Bernardus, Langwaden 2000 and 2002.  and 

German Cistercians
13th-century German historians
Cistercian abbots
12th-century births
1221 deaths
Writers from Hesse
People from the Rheingau